Algoa may refer to:
Algoa, Texas, an unincorporated community in Galveston County, Texas, United States
Algoa Bay, a wide inlet along the South African east coast
Algoa FM, a Commercial radio station
1394 Algoa, an asteroid